Suha or Soha (Arabic: suhā, suhâ سُهى; written variant سُها) is an Arabic female given name literal meaning is "a certain star of a constellation which is transparent, hidden or invisible".  However, the name also bears the meaning of "young star" or "moon(s) or satellite(s)", "hidden planet or star obscured by view, overlooked, oversight or neglected".

It is also the name of the star Alcor called "Suha (al-Suhā, as-Suhā السُّهَا)" but bears the meaning "forgotten, neglected, overlooked, distracted". There is an Arab saying possibly related to the name of the star: "aray-hā 's-suhā wa-turī-nī 'l-qamar (أريها السها وتريني القمر)" meaning "show her as-Suhā (the constellation Alcor) and show me the moon", the correlation to the name of the star used as a metaphor is that "a person beaten by someone who asks about something but was given a distant answer".

And also used as Korean name recently. Around 300 new-born baby has this name, mostly girls. Meaning is related with river because "Ha" is mostly used this chinese character
河(korean pronounce : ha), which is meaning "river"

People with the given name Soha or Suha
Soha Abed Elaal - Egyptian athlete

Soha Ali Khan - Indian actress

Soha Bechara - Lebanese nationalist

Soha Hassoun

Suha Arafat - Former Palestinian Authority President Yasser Arafat's wife

Notes

See also
 for articles on persons with this first name

 for articles on persons with this first name

Arabic feminine given names